JonOne (born John Andrew Perello, 1963), also known as Jon156, is an American graffiti artist. Originally from New York, he lives and works in Paris.

Early life and upbringing
JonOne was born in New York's Harlem neighborhood to parents from the Dominican Republic. Growing up in Harlem, his introduction to street art began when he would see graffiti and tags on subway cars and city walls. When he was 17 years old he entered the world of graffiti with his childhood friend "White Man," tagging his name Jon with the numbers 156 on walls and trains in his neighborhood. JonOne said, "The subway is a museum that runs through the city."

In 1984, JonOne founded the graffiti group , in order to bring together their passion for painting trains at night and to help forget about their problems, including drug use. At this time, he met the artist Bando, who was living in New York. Following an invitation from Bando, JonOne moved to Paris in 1987.

Career
JonOne began his work as a painter on canvas in a workshop at the Hospital Ephemeral, a literal hospital building that became a squatting place for artists, located in the 18th arrondissement of Paris. Here, he painted with the artists A-One, Sharp, Ash (Victor Ash), Jayone and Skki. 
 
JonOne made a name for himself in Parisian artistic circles through his work on canvas and the exhibitions he held, including one in 1990 at Gallery 45 Gleditsch in Berlin and the exhibition Graffiti Paris, at rue Chapon in Paris.

At an Artcurial auction on June 6, 2007, Match Point, a large canvas by JonOne made at the Hospital Ephemeral in 1993, was bought by a New York collector for €24,800, a record sale for the artist. This auction was also the highest bid ever obtained in France for a work of graffiti art.
Since 2013 JonOne enriched its creation by collaborating with Didier Marien from the Boccara Gallery on an important series of street art rugs.

Quotes

Exhibitions

SOLO

2023

17 Mars 2023 –  16 Juin 2023 – Rosewood – Thai Love – Exposition personnelle – Bangkok, Thailand 

2021

21 Mars 2021 –  24 Mai 2021 – Rasson Art Gallery – Exposition personnelle – Knokke, Belgique
2020

2020

26 novembre 2020 –  23 Janvier 2021 – Galerie Provost-Hacker – Exposition personnelle – Lille, France

12 novembre 2020 –  22 Novembre 2020 – ArtTime – Exposition personnelle – Dakar, Sénégal, Afrique

9 octobre 2020 – 25 octobre 2020 – Les Docks X Galerie David Pluskwa – Unlimited – Exposition personnelle – Marseille, France

1er octobre 2020 – 17 octobre 2020 – Galerie Veyssière Sigma – Jonone – Exposition personnelle – Tours, France

24 septembre 2020 – 24 octobre 2020 – Galerie Rive Gauche – Marcel Strouk – Journal Intime – Exposition personnelle – Paris, France

14 septembre 2020 –  19 septembre 2020 – Kolly Gallery – Wedding Planners – Exposition personnelle – Zürich, Suisse

10 septembre 2020 – 24 octobre 2020 – Underdogs Gallery – The Border – Exposition personnelle – Lisbonne, Portugal

10 septembre 2020 – 13 septembre 2020 – Art Paris – Galery Rabouan Moussion – Exposition collective – Paris, France

23 mai 2020 – 31 juillet 2020 –  Galerie Rabouan Moussion –  Infinity – Exposition personnelle – Paris, France

11 mars 2020 – 23 Janvier 2021– Institut Culturel Bernard Magrez – Free Spirit –  Exposition personnelle – Bordeaux, France

4 mars 2020 – 8 mars 2020 – Galerie Provost-Hacker – Exposition collective – Lille, France

21 février 2020 – 21 mars 2020 – ArtTime – Retour A La Source – Exposition personnelle – Abidjan, Côte d’Ivoire, Afrique

 

2019 
 
16 décembre 2019 – 21 décembre 2019 – Kolly Gallery – Countdown – Exposition personnelle – Zürich, Suisse

3 décembre 2019 – 8 décembre 2019 – Fabien Castanier Gallery – Exposition collective – Miami Art Basel – Miami, Etats-Unis

26 novembre 2019 – 1er février 2020 – Fabien Castanier Gallery – Colors Of The Uprising – Exposition personnelle – Miami, Etats-Unis

15 novembre 2019 – 17 novembre 2019 – Galerie Provost-Hacker – Art Fair – ST Art – Exposition collective – Strasbourg, France

4 octobre 2019 – 02 novembre 2019 – Galerie Rabouan Moussion –Exposition collective – Paris, France

25 septembre 2019 – 17 octobre 2019 – Not A Gallery – Exposition personnelle – Paris, France

9 septembre 2019 – 14 septembre 2019 – Kolly Gallery – Palmtrees And Ice Cream – Exposition personnelle – Zürich, Suisse

7 septembre 2019 – 23 Novembre 2019 – Galerie Droste – Blue Night – Exposition personnelle – Wuppertal, Allemagne

5 juillet 2019 – 29 juillet 2019 – Galerie David Pluskwa – Art Show – Exposition collective – Saint-Tropez, France

16 juin 2019 – 26 août 2019 – Galerie Rabouan Moussion – Spend The Summer With Us In La Baule – Exposition collective – La Baule, France

13 juin 2019 – 30 juin 2019 – Galerie Bartoux – The Night Show – Exposition solo – Paris, France

6 juin 2019 – 14 juillet 2019 – Galerie Martine Ehmer – Shapes & Shades – Exposition collective – Bruxelles, Belgique

18 avril 2019 – 11 mai 2019 – Galerie Le Feuvre & Roze – Flash Back – Exposition collective – Paris, France

15 avril 2019 – 20 avril 2019 – Kolly Gallery – Plan B – Exposition solo – Zürich, Suisse

13 avril 2019 – 11 mai 2019 – Speerstra Gallery – Legends #1 – Exposition collective – Paris, France

9 avril 2019 – 18 mai 2019 – Galerie Brugier Rigail – Poetry In Motion – Exposition solo – Paris, France

6 avril 2019 – 20 mai 2019 – Musée Boucher-de-Perthes – Basquiat, la rue nous inspire – Exposition collective – Abbeville, France

4 avril 2019 – 7 avril 2019 – Galerie Rabouan-Moussion – Art Paris – Exposition collective – Paris, France

28 mars 2019 – 5 mai 2019 – Galerie Martine Ehmer X Galerie David Pluskwa –Abstracted Expressionism – Exposition solo – Bruxelles, Belgique

21 mars 2019 –  24 mars 2019 – 33 Place du Châtelain / Galerie Martine Ehmer X Galerie David Pluskwa – Abstracted Expressionism – Exposition solo – Bruxelles, Belgique

28 février 2019 – 3 mars 2019 – Galerie Provost-Hacker – Art Fair – Art-Up – Exposition collective – Lille, France

25 janvier 2019 – 26 avril 2019 – MoCA –  Post Contemporary – Urban Graphic 7019 – Exposition collective – Shanghaï, Chine
2018

13 novembre 2018 – 15 février 2019 – Musée Mohammed VI d’Art Moderne et Contemporain – Illuminer le Futur – Exposition personnelle – Rabat, Maroc

22 août 2018 – 15 octobre 2018 – Gallery 32 – Blue Diamonds – Exposition personnelle – Tel Aviv, Israël

14 juillet 2018 – 16 août 2018 – Galerie David Pluskwa – Art Show – Exposition collective – Saint-Tropez, France

3 juillet 2018 – 15 septembre 2018 – Mausa / Galerie Brugier Rigail – Jonone At The Museum – Exposition personnelle – Toulouse, France

20 juin 2018 – 8 juillet 2018 – Galerie David Pluskwa – Love Diary – Exposition personnelle – Marseille, France

13 juin 2018 – 29 juillet 2018 – Palais de la Bourse / Galerie David Pluskwa – Abstracted Love – Exposition personnelle – Marseille, France

7 juin 2018 – 31 juillet 2018 – Galerie Provost-Hacker – Mes Monochromes – Exposition personnelle – Lille, France

19 avril 2018 – 12 mai 2018  – Kolly Gallery – Following My Path – Exposition personnelle – Zürich, Suisse

12 avril 2018 – 27 mai 2017 – Galerie Rabouan-Moussion – In The Box – Exposition personnelle – Paris, France

12 avril 2018 – 15 avril 2018 – Galerie du jour agnès b. – Urban Art Fair – Exposition collective – Paris, France

5 avril 2018 – 8 avril 2018 – Galerie Rabouan-Moussion – Art Paris – Exposition collective – Paris, France

3 avril 2018 – 20 mai 2018 – Galerie agnès b. – Jonone in Gotham – Exposition collective – New York, USA

29 mars 2018 – 21 avril 2018 – Art Statements Gallery – Painting Sounds – Exposition personnelle – Hong Kong, Chine

16 mars 2018 – 14 avril 2018 – Wunderkammern Gallery – Niente Può Fermarmi – Exposition personnelle – Rome, Italie

15 mars 2018 – 24 avril 2018 – Galerie Brugier-Rigail – Birth Of The Wind – Exposition personnelle – Paris, France

17 février 2018 –7 mars 2018 – Fabien Castanier Gallery – Wanderlust – Exposition personnelle – Miami, Etats-Unis

15 février 2018 – 19 février 2018 – Fabien Castanier Gallery – Exposition collective – Miami Art Wynwood – Miami, Etats-Unis

15 février 2018 – 18 février 2018 – New Square Gallery – Art Fair – Art-Up – Exposition collective – Lille, France

2017

10 novembre 2017 – 3 janvier 2018 – Fondation Clément – Exposition personnelle – Martinique

1er Novembre 2017 – fin janvier 2018 – Jardin Rouge / Fondation Montresso – Exposition personnelle – Marrakech, Maroc

13 juillet 2017 – 10 août 2017 – Galerie David Pluskwa – Art Show – Exposition collective – Saint-Tropez, France

1er Juin 2017– 12 juillet 2017 – Galerie Rive Gauche-Marcel Strouk – No Rules – Exposition personnelle – Paris, France

20 avril 2017 – 23 avril 2017 – Galerie du jour agnès b. – Urban Art Fair – Exposition collective – Paris, France

8 mai 2017 – 14 mai 2017 – The Plantation / Kolly Gallery – Who’s Your Daddy? Phnom Penh – Exposition collective – Phnom Penh, Cambodge

18 juin 2017 – La Condition Publique / Galerie Magda Danysz – Street Génération(s) 40 ans d’Art Urbain – Exposition collective – Roubaix, France

23 février 2017 – 26 février 2017 – Kolly Gallery – International New Contemporary Art Fair / Palacio de Neptuno / Urvanity-Art Fair – Exposition collective – Madrid, Espagne

25 février 2017 – 28 février 2017 – New Square Gallery – Art Fair – Art-Up – Exposition collective – Lille, France

2016
1er décembre 2016 – 4 décembre 2016 – Fabien Castanier Gallery – Exposition collective – Miami Art Basel – Miami, Etats-Unis
30 novembre 2016 – 8 janvier 2017 – Galeries Bartoux – Crossing Over – Exposition personnelle – New-York, Etats-Unis
14 octobre 2016 – 10 novembre 2016 – Maison Guerlain / Parcours privé de la FIAC – Belle Ville – Exposition collective – Paris, France
12 octobre 2016 – 16 octobre 2016 – Galerie Brugier Rigail – KIAF 2016 / Art Seoul – Exposition collective – Séoul, Corée du Sud
17 septembre 2016 – 12 novembre 2016 – Galerie Droste – Transit – Exposition personnelle – Wuppertal, Allemagne
21 août 2016 – 30 septembre 2016 – DT 32 Concept Gallery – Sitting on a Cloud – Exposition personnelle – Tel Aviv, Israël
1er juillet 2016 – 24 août 2016 – Magda Danysz Gallery / 3B Gallery, CAFA Art Museum – Art From The Streets – Exposition collective – Beijing, Chine
1er juin 2016 – 15 juillet 2016 – Galerie Laurent Strouk – Urban And Street Art – Exposition collective – Paris, France
14 mai 2016 – 11 juin 2016 – Fabien Castanier Gallery – Urban Legacy – Exposition personnelle – Los Angeles, Etats-Unis
22 avril 2016 – 24 avril 2016 – Galerie du jour agnès b. – Urban Art Fair – Exposition collective – Paris, France
– Urban Legacy –, Fabien Castanier Gallery, Los Angeles, Etats-Unis
– Fire On Water –, Galerie Rabouan Moussion, Paris, France
– Masterpieces –, 1991-2008, Galerie Le Feuvre, Paris, France
15 mars 2016 – 21 mai 2016 – Wunderkammern Gallery – Predictably irrational – Exposition personnelle – Milan, Italie
31 mars 2016 – 3 avril 2016 – Galerie Rabouan-Moussion – Art Paris – Exposition collective – Paris, France
17 mars 2016 – 23 avril 2016 – Galerie Le Feuvre – Masterpieces, 1991-2008 – Exposition personnelle – Paris, France
10 mars 2016 – 9 avril 2016 – Kolly Gallery – Solo Show – Exposition personnelle – Zürich, Suisse
26 février 2016 – 19 mars 2016 – Galerie David Pluskwa – Inédite(s) – Exposition collective – Marseille, France
4 janvier 2016 – 29 février 2016 – Maison Guerlain – Color Flows – Exposition personnelle – Paris, France
 

2015
23 décembre 2015 – 10 janvier 2016 – Galerie Martine Ehmer – Exposition collective – Bruxelles, Belgique
27 novembre 2015 – 16 janvier 2016 – Art Works Paris-Séoul Gallery – Exposition personnelle – Séoul, Corée du Sud
26 novembre 2015 – 9 janvier 2016  – New Square Gallery – The Power of The Benjamins – Exposition personnelle – Lille, France
10 septembre 2015 – 24 octobre 2015 – Galerie du jour, agnès b. – Fireworks – Exposition personnelle – Paris, France
10 septembre 2015 – 13 septembre 2015 – Kolly Gallery – Who’s Your Daddy ? – Exposition collective – Lausanne, Suisse
20 août 2015 – 27 septembre 2015 – DT 32 Concept Gallery ltd – Walking To The Sun – Exposition personnelle – Tel Aviv, Israël
21 juillet 2015 – 26 juillet 2015 – Galerie Boccara – Point Art Monaco Art Fair – Exposition collective – Monaco, France
18 juillet 2015 – 16 août 2015 – Galerie David Pluskwa – Art Show – Exposition collective – Saint-Tropez, France
10 juillet 2015 – 31 août 2015 – Galerie Magda Danysz – Staring To The Stars – Exposition personnelle – Shanghai, Chine
24 juin 2015 – 1er novembre 2015 – Carré Saint-Anne – Above And Below – Exposition personnelle – Montpellier, France
14 mai 2015 – 23 août 2015 – Institut Culturel Bernard Magrez – King Of Harlem – Exposition collective – Bordeaux, France
25 mars 2015 – 29 mars 2015 – Galerie Rabouan-Moussion – Art Paris – Exposition collective – Paris, France
12 mars 2015 – 25 avril 2015 – Galerie Rive Gauche-Marcel Strouk – JonOne Transformations II – Exposition personnelle – Paris, France
12 février 2015 – 15 février 2015 – New Square Gallery – Art Fair – Art-Up – Exposition collective – Lille, France
6 février 2015 – 27 février 2015 – Galerie David Pluskwa – From Street 2 Art – Exposition collective – Marseille, France
31 janvier 2015 – 28 février 2015 – Galerie Brugier-Rigail – American Graffiti – Exposition collective – Paris, France
15 janvier 2015 – 15 février 2015 – Kolly Gallery – Past & Future – Exposition collective – Zürich, Suisse
 

2014
24 octobre 2014 – 30 novembre 2014 – Bund 18 Gallery – Look Through – Exposition collective – Shanghai, Chine
17 octobre 2014 – 29 novembre 2014 – Galerie David Pluskwa – The Chronicles – Exposition personnelle – Marseille, France
13 juillet 2014 – 3 août 2014 – Galerie David Pluskwa – Art Show – Exposition collective – Saint-Tropez, France
7 juin 2014 – 12 juillet 2014 – Fabien Castanier Gallery – West Side Stories –Exposition personnelle – Los Angeles, Etats-Unis
8 mai 2014 – 21 juin 2014 – Art Statements Gallery – JonOne : Back In Town – Exposition personnelle – Hong Kong, Chine
12 avril 2014 – 15 octobre 2014 – La Villa – New York-Calvi – Exposition collective – Calvi, France
26 mars 2014 – 30 mars 2014 – Galerie Rabouan-Moussion – Art Paris – Exposition collective – Paris, France
22 mars 2014 – 28 juin 2014 – Galerie Rabouan-Moussion – Evolution To Oils – Exposition personnelle – Paris, France
14 mars 2014 – 19 avril 2014 – Galerie David Pluskwa – Love Etc… – Exposition collective – Marseille, France
27 février 2014 – 22 mars 2014 – Kolly Gallery – Cryptation – Exposition personnelle – Zürich, Suisse
13 février 2014 – 16 février 2014 – New Square Gallery – Art Fair – Art-Up – Exposition collective – Lille, France
17 janvier 2014 – 2 mars 2014 – Galerie Helenbeck – Dites-le avec de la poésie – Exposition collective (JonOne, Ben Vautier, Quentin Derouet, Philippe Perrin) – Nice, France
11 janvier 2014 – 8 février 2014 – Gallery Magda Danysz – Black & White – Exposition collective (YZ, JonOne et Nicolas Buffe) – Paris, France
 

2013
7 décembre 2013 – 25 avril 2014 – Galerie Bartoux / Office de tourisme de Courchevel – Street Art par JonOne – Exposition personnelle – Courchevel, France
3 décembre 2013 – 8 décembre 2013 – Fabien Castanier Gallery – Art Fair – Art Basel / Miami Beach – Exposition collective – Miami, Etats-Unis
29 novembre 2013 – 25 janvier 2014 – New Square Gallery – When The Substance Becomes Bigger Than The Being (Blood Of Paris) – Exposition personnelle – Lille, France
29 novembre 2013 – 4 décembre 2013 – Boccara Gallery – Art Fair – Moscow
World Fine Art Fair – Moscou, Russie
13 novembre 2013 – 4 décembre 2013 – Boccara Gallery – Street-Art Paty JonOne – Exposition personnelle – Moscou, Russie
17 octobre 2013 – 27 octobre 2013 – Boutique agnès b. – L’art contemporain s’invite à Saint-Germain – Exposition personnelle – Paris, France
13 septembre 2013 – 26 octobre 2013 – Galerie du jour agnès b. – Etat des Lieux –Exposition collective (JonOne, Lek, LeModuleDeZeer, Ludo, LXA, Monsieur Qui, OX, Paris, Philippe Baudelocque, Poch, Psyckoze, Seth, Sowat, Wayla) – Paris, France
10 juillet 2013 – 2 août 2013 et 27 août 2013 – 12 octobre 2013 – Galerie David Pluskwa – Exposition collective (Tilt, Robert Combas, jef Aérosol, Eric Liot, ROD, Charlelie Couture, Elisabeth Montagnier, Peter Klasen, Jak Espi, Niki de Saint-Phalle, JonOne, Philippe Pasqua, Nicolas Rubinstein, Erro) – Marseille, France
4 juillet 2013 – 27 juillet 2013 – Art Partner Galerie, Laurent Rigail & Eric Brugier – Iron One – Exposition personnelle – Paris, France
27 juin 2013 – 27 juillet 2013 – Galerie Hélène Bailly – Lyrics ! – Exposition collective (Alexöne, BleuNoir, Gao Jie, JonOne, Nasty, Luke Newton, Marke Newton, Nicolas de Crecy, Vuk Vidor, Jef Aérosol…) – Paris, France
15 juin 2013 – 14 juillet 2013 – Galerie Martine Ehmer – U.R. Urban Renewal – Urban Art Group Show – Exposition collective (Jef Aérosol, L’Atlas, JonOne, Kool Koor, Spark, Tanc, Tilt, Quick) – Bruxelles, Belgique
16 mai 2013 – 16 juin 2013 – Galerie Le Feuvre – Past-Present – Exposition collective (Sam Francis-JonOne) – Paris, France
11 avril 2013 – 14 avril 2013 – Galerie Rabouan-Moussion – Carrousel du Louvre – Drawing Now – Exposition collective (Kirill Chelushkin, JonOne, Katarina Legrady, Luke Newton, Ira Waldron) – Paris, France
6 avril 2013 – 18 avril 2013 – Galerie Rabouan-Moussion – Exposition collective (Vlad Mamyshev Monroe, Dimitri Tsykalov, Ira Waldron, Erwin Olaf, Kata Legrady, Sunil Gawde, JonOne, Luke Newton) – Paris, France
mars- avril 2013 – Galerie Helenbeck – Mix of Artists – Exposition collective (Pasqua, MNR, Combas, JonOne) – Nice, France
28 mars 2013 – 1er avril 2013 – Galerie Rabouan-Moussion – Art Paris – Exposition collective – Paris, France
7 mars 2013 – 10 mars 2013 – Galerie Martine Ehmer – Art Fair Grand Palais – Exposition collective – Lille, France
6 mars 2013 – 10 mars 2013 – Fabien Castanier Gallery – Art Fair – Scope NY – Exposition collective (Speedy Graphito, JonOne, Eric Liot, RERO, Diana Thorneycroft) – New York, Etats-Unis
14 février 2013 – 18 mai 2013 – Fondation Protvor / En partenariat avec la Galerie Le Feuvre – Chaotic Beauty – Exposition personnelle – Saint-Pétersbourg, Russie
14 février 2013 – 18 février 2013 – Fabien Castanier Gallery – Art Fair – Art Wynwood – Exposition collective (Speedy Graphito, JonOne, Eric Liot, RERO, Tilt) – Miami, Etats-Unis
29 janvier 2013 – 22 février 2013 – Art Partner Galerie, Laurent Rigail & Eric Brugier – J-Punk – Exposition personnelle – Paris, France
23 janvier 2013 – 27 janvier 2013 – Fabien Castanier Gallery – Art Fair – LA Art Show – Exposition collective (Charlie Anderson, Speedy Graphito, JonOne, RERO, Seen, Tilt) – Los Angeles, Etats-Unis
21 janvier 2013 – 6 février 2013 – Galerie David Plukwa / Espace 53 – Vanité(s) / Memento Mori ou Les Précieuses Morts de… – Exposition collective – Marseille, France
17 janvier 2013 – 23 février 2013 – Galerie Martine Ehmer – Twi-Lights Of Colors – Exposition personnelle – Bruxelles, Belgique
 

2012
3 novembre 2012 – 16 décembre 2012 – Fabien Castanier Gallery – A Beautiful Madness – Exposition personnelle – Los Angeles, Etats-Unis
28 septembre 2012 – 17 octobre 2012 – Galerie David Pluskwa – Untitled – Exposition personnelle – Marseille, France
13 juillet 2012 – 25 juillet 2012 – Galerie Barbara De Palma / Galerie David Pluskwa – Untitled – Exposition personnelle – Saint-Tropez, France
30 juin 2012 – 2 septembre 2012 – Fabien Castanier Gallery – FreeStyle – Exposition collective (Tilt, Zevs, Shepard Fairey, Speedy Graphito, JonOne…) – California, Etats-Unis
19 juin 2012 – 5 août 2012 – Ancien Collège des Jésuites – Association Traffic – PostGraffiti – Exposition collective – Reims, France
16 juin 2012 – 31 juillet 2012 – Galerie Rabouan-Moussion – La Peau De L’ours – Exposition collective – Paris, France
24 mai 2012 – 24 juin 2012 – Galerie Le Feuvre – & Friends – Exposition collective – Paris, France
19 mai 2012 – 30 juin 2012 – Gallery Magda Danysz – Overlook – Exposition collective – Shanghai, Chine
12 mai 2012 – 24 juin 2012 – Fabien Castanier Gallery – French (Connection) Invasion – Exposition collective (JonOne, Nasty, RERO, Tilt, Speedy Graphito) – California, Etats-Unis
11 mai 2012 – 30 juin 2012 – Fabien Hulin, Anthony Phuong et IM Art – In & Out… De l’art contemporain – Exposition collective (Alëxone, L’Atlas, C215, JonOne, Nasty, Ernest Pignon Ernest, Antonio Segui, Tanc…) – Ivry-Sur-Seine, France
11 mai 2012 – 30 juin 2012 – Nicolas Laugeron Collection / Angers – Grand Théâtre d’Angers – Exposition collective – Angers, France
11 mai 2012 – 16 juin 2012 – Galerie Rive Gauche-Marcel Strouk – JonOne Transformations – Exposition personnelle – Paris, France
16 avril 2012 – Barrière Hotel – Performance – Lille, France
14 avril 2012 – 19 juin 2012 – Maison Folie de Moulins – Association Traffic – PostGraffiti – Exposition collective – Lille, France
12 avril 2012 – 15 avril 2012 – New Square Gallery – Lille Art Fair – Exposition collective – Lille, France
29 mars 2012 – 1er avril 2012 – Galerie Rabouan-Moussion – Art Paris – Exposition collective – Paris, France
 

2011
25 novembre 2011 – 28 janvier 2012 – New Square Gallery – Out Of Nowhere – Exposition personnelle – Lille, France
25 novembre 2011 – 26 novembre 2011 – BKRW – Throw Up – Exposition personnelle – Paris, France
19 novembre 2011 – 21 janvier 2012 – Galerie Rabouan-Moussion – The City Breathes… – Exposition personnelle – Paris, France
28 octobre 2011 – 19 novembre 2011 – Galerie Martine Ehmer – Out of the wall – Exposition collective (Miss Tic, JM Pradel-Fraysse, Smael) – Bruxelles, Belgique
20 octobre 2011 – 20 novembre 2011 – Venise Cadre Gallery – Untitled – Exposition personnelle – Casablanca, Maroc
22 septembre 2011 – 22 octobre 2011 – Galerie Le Feuvre – One Wall one Painting – Exposition collective – Paris, France
15 septembre 2011 – 4 mars 2012 – Halle Saint-Pierre – Hey ! / Modern Art and Pop Culture – Exposition collective – Paris, France
9 juillet 2011 – 10 septembre 2011 – Galerie Helenbeck – Melange of Street Art Artists – Exposition collective – Nice, France
7 juillet 2011 – 25 août 2011 – Gallery Magda Danysz – Untitled – Exposition personnelle – Shanghai, Chine
7 juillet 2011 – 25 août 2011 – Bund 18 Gallery – Untitled – Exposition personnelle – Shanghai, Chine
25 mars 2011 – 12 mai 2011 – Gallery Magda Danysz – Words and Dreams, Where technology meets dreams and vice versa – Exposition collective – Shanghai, Chine
10 mars 2011 – 10 avril 2011 – Galerie Le Feuvre – Da Sun Will Always Shine – Exposition personnelle – Paris, France
3 février 2011 – 26 février 2011 – Centre Culturel Jean Cocteau – Urban Activity – Exposition collective (Jef Aérosol, JonOne, L’Atlas, Popay, Psyckoze, Rero, Sun 7, Speddy Graphito, Tanc, Yeemd) – Les Lilas, France
20 janvier 2011 – 12 février 2011 – Galerie Le Feuvre – Chrome – Exposition collective (Ella & Pitr, Invader, Ikon, JonOne, Katrin Fridriks, Marthaud, Marke Newton, Mist) – Paris, France
 

2010
2010 – Galerie Helenbeck – We’re all Graffitti Artist’s – Exposition collective – Antibes, France
14 décembre 2010 – 26 février 2011 – Galerie Helenbeck – Da New Work – Exposition personnelle – Nice, France
2 décembre 2010 – 9 janvier 2011 – Brigitte Argième & Swatch Group – City Time – Off The Wall – Exposition collective (JonOne, Blade, Quick, Sozyone, Ikon) – Genève, Suisse
27 novembre 2010 – 24 décembre 2010 – Gallery Magda Danysz – Abstractions – Exposition personnelle – Paris, France
20 novembre 2010 – 22 janvier 2011 – Speerstra Gallery – Retrospective 20 ans / 20 years – Exposition personnelle – Bursins, Suisse
19 novembre 2010 – 18 décembre 2010 – Galerie Martine Ehmer – Art you curious – Exposition collective (JonOne, Speedy Graphito, LA II, JM Pradel-Fraysse) – Bruxelles, Belgique
11 septembre 2010 – 2 october 2010 – Galerie Australe – Escape From New York – Exposition personnelle – Saint-Denis de la Réunion
15 juin 2010 – 15 juillet 2010 – Gallery Magda Danysz – C1TY Arts, Architecture and Music – Exposition collective – Shanghai, Chine
4 juin 2010 – 26 juin 2010 – Art Partner Galerie, Laurent Rigail & Eric Brugier – Carved In Stone – Exposition personnelle – Paris, France
13 mars 2010 – 30 mai 2010 – Fondation Salomon / Collection de Claudine et Jean-Marc Salomon – Collection 3 – Exposition collective – Annecy, France
 

2009
2009 – Gallery Magda Danysz – From Style Writing To Art – Exposition collective – Paris, France
24 décembre 2009 – 21 janvier 2010 – Gallery Magda Danysz – From Style Writing To Art (Part 2) – Exposition collective – Shanghai, Chine
3 décembre 2009 – 24 décembre 2009 – Art Partner Galerie, Laurent Rigail & Eric Brugier – Autoportraits – Exposition personnelle – Paris, France
4 novembre 2009 – 31 janvier 2010 – Galerie Helenbeck – Who’s The King – Exposition collective – Paris, France
22 octobre 2009 – 21 novembre 2009 – The Don Gallery – Untitled – Exposition personnelle – Milan, Italie
17 septembre 2009 – 17 octobre 2009 – Speerstra Gallery – Close up – Exposition personnelle – Genève, Suisse
7 juillet 2009 – 29 novembre 2009 – Fondation Cartier – Born in The Street / Né dans la rue – Exposition collective – Paris, France
4 juillet 2009 – 31 juillet 2009 – Gallery Magda Danysz – The Art is Yours – Exposition personnelle – Paris, France
25 juin 2009 – 30 juillet 2009 – 18 Bund Gallery / Gallery Magda Danysz – Untitled – Exposition personnelle – Shanghai, Chine
29 mai 2009 – 27 juin 2009 – Galerie Helenbeck – Whole in the Wall 1970-Now – Exposition collective (JonOne, Blade, Crash, Quik, Sharp) – New York, Etats-Unis
19 mai 2009 – 13 juin 2009 – Galerie Alexis Lartigue – Exposition collective (JonOne, Speedy Graphito, L’Atlas, Babou, Sun 7, Philippe Bonan, Run don’t walk, Malatesa, J. Mesnager, Mosko & associés) – Paris, France
15 mai 2009 – 13 juin 2009 – Graffiti Gallery – Exposition personnelle – Copenhague, Danemark
27 mars 2009 – 26 avril 2009 – Grand Palais – Collection Gallizia – Le Tag – Exposition collective – Paris, France
19 mars 2009 – 30 avril 2009 – Galerie Helenbeck – Il est interdit d’interdire – Exposition collective – Nice, France
31 janvier 2009 – 1er mars 2009 – Maison Folie de Moulins – Propeace – Exposition collective – Lille, France
22 janvier 2009 – 26 janvier 2009 – Gallery Magda Danysz – Arte Fiera – Exposition collective – Bologne, Italie
 

2008
2008 – Galerie Helenbeck – I – Exposition collective – Nice, France
2008 – Art Partner Gallery – Street Art – Exposition collective (JonOne, Speedy Graphito, Jef Aérosol, Taling) – Strasbourg, France
20 décembre 2008 – 17 janvier 2009 – Gallery Magda Danysz – The Drawing Hand – Exposition collective – Paris, France
5 décembre 2008 – 24 décembre 2008 – Art Partner Galerie, Laurent Rigail & Eric Brugier – Petits formats… Grands artistes – Exposition collective (Arman, Combas, Francky Boy, Jef Aérosol, Ikon, JonOne, LA II, Speedy Graphito, Sweetlove, Taling…) – Paris, France
26 novembre 2008 – 1er mars 2009 – Galerie Helenbeck / Partenariat Galerie Gismondi – Whole in The Wall / American Graffiti / Art 70’s 90’s – Exposition collective (JonOne, Blade, Crash, Quick, Sharp) – Nice, France
21 novembre 2008 – 1er mars 2009 – Galerie Helenbeck / Partenariat Galerie Gismondi – Whole in The Wall / American Graffiti / Art 70’s 90’s – Exposition collective (JonOne, Blade, Crash, Quick, Sharp) – Paris, France
20 novembre 2008 – 1er mars 2009 – Galerie Gismondi / Partenariat avec la Galerie Helenbeck – Whole In The Wall / American Graffiti / Art 70’s 90’s – Exposition collective (JonOne, Blade, Crash, Quick, Sharp) – Paris, France
13 novembre 2008 – 20 décembre 2008 – Galerie Le Feuvre – My Father’s Keeper – Exposition personnelle – Paris, France
25 septembre 2008 – Galerie Aga / La Cornue – De l’Art à la Table – Exposition personnelle – Gland, Suisse
2 juin 2008 – 19 juillet 2008 – Galerie Helenbeck – Sex Times Group – Exposition collective – Paris, France
22 mai 2008 – 20 juin 2008 – Speerstra Gallery – Brut Graffiti (paintings) and Follow The Sun (works on paper) – Exposition personnelle – Bursins, Suisse
16 mai 2008 – 28 juillet 2008 – Carol Jazzar – JonOne Miami Beat – Exposition personnelle – Miami, Etats-Unis
 

2007
2007 – Art Statement Gallery – Harbour City – Urban Calligraphy – Hong Kong, Chine
21 novembre 2007 – 29 janvier 2008 – Galerie Helenbeck – The Law Against The Street – Exposition collective (JonOne with Sylvio Magaglio) – Nice, France
18 octobre 2007 – 17 novembre 2007 – Gallery Magda Danysz – Game Over, Street Art Show – Exposition collective (JonOne, Psyckoze, Lokiss, Cope2, Nunca) – Paris, France
30 juin 2007 – 13 janvier 2008 – Musée International de l’Art Modeste – L’Art Modeste sous les Bombes – Exposition collective (Alëxone, Esmaeil Bahrani, Dzus, David Ellis, Maya Hayuk, JonOne, Mist, Nunca, Reach, Zonenkinder) – Sète, France
30 juin 2007 – 30 septembre 2007 – Abbaye Auberive – Le Graffiti Historique : Speerstra Collection / L’Abbaye sous les Bombes – Exposition collective – Auberive, France
30 juin 2007 – 19 septembre 2007 – Musée Paul Valéry – Le Graffiti Historique : Collection Speerstra – Exposition collective – Sète, France
7 juin 2007 – 8 juillet 2007 – Galerie Helenbeck – Sir JonOne à Paris – Exposition personnelle – Paris, France
4 mai 2007 – 16 juin 2007 – Speerstra Gallery – Art of Living – Exposition personnelle – Bursins, Suisse
 

2006
2006 – Art Statement Gallery – JonOne live painting and srt jam session – Finds – Hong Kong, Chine
18 novembre 2006 – 22 décembre 2006 – Galerie5213 – /52°30’24”,13°25’19”/ – Berlin, Allemagne
28 octobre 2006 – 2 décembre 2006 – Espace Art 22 – Bruxelles, Belgique
21 octobre 2006 – 21 novembre 2006 – Galerie du jour agnès b. – Friends of Basquiat Show – Exposition collective – Paris, France
11 mai 2006 – 27 mai 2006 – Speerstra Gallery – Serigraff – Exposition personnelle – Paris, France
13 avril 2006 – 27 mai 2006 – Galerie du jour agnès b. – Ugly Winners – Exposition collective (Jean-Michel Basquiat, Keith Haring, Futura, Zevs, JonOne, Shepard Fairey, Espo, Andy Jenkins…) – Paris, France
28 mars 2006 – 4 avril 2006 – Art Statement Gallery – Festival Walk and opened Max Mara flagship store opening : “The Realm of Decorative Arts” – Hong Kong, Chine
 

2005
2005 – The Live Issue.#2, Back Jumps – Berlin, Allemagne
2005 – Art Statement Gallery – Festival Walk, JonOne’s Graffiti – Hong Kong, Chine
6 octobre 2005 – 29 octobre 2005 – Speerstra Gallery – Urban Calligraphy – Exposition personnelle – Paris, France
16 septembre 2005 – 29 octobre 2005 – Galerie du jour agnès b. – Bande à Part, New York Underground 60’s 70’s 80’s – Exposition collective – Paris, France
27 mai 2005 – 18 juin 2005 – Galerie Helenbeck – Exposition personnelle – Nice, France
8 avril 2005 – 7 mai 2005 – Showroom Cor +Interlubke – Future Fantasy – Exposition collective (Akroe, Brad Digital, JonOne, LX, Mist, Ogre, Rough, RX110, Steph.cop) – Strasbourg, France
 

2004
2004 – Galerie Helenbeck – Remix Art Collection – Commande à JonOne d’une série de 4 chaises Louis XV – Nice, France
2004 – Art Statement Gallery – Ice Blue – Hong Kong, Chine
20 octobre 2004 – Espace ArtCLub de La FIAC – Exposition collective (Obey Giant, Michal Batory, Influenza, Alexöne, Wang Du, JonOne, Futura 2000, André, Yann Tama, Katinka Bock et Ulrike Mohr, Georges Rousse, Bad BC, Zeng Hao, Malte Martin, Raymond Hains, Raphaël Boccanfuso, Zevs, Miss Tic, Matthieu Laurette, Hervé di Rosa) – Paris, France
16 octobre 2004 – 27 novembre 2004 – Galerie Speerstra – Night and Day – Exposition personnelle – Paris, France
9 avril 2004 – 13 juin 2004 – Les Abattoirs – La collection d’art contemporain d’agnès b. – Je m’installe aux Abattoirs – Exposition collective – Toulouse, France
11 mars 2004 – 18 avril 2004 – Anthem Gallery – C3 – Exposition collective (Keirnan Costello, Jonathan Fenske, JonOne) – New York, Etats-Unis
 

2003
2003 – Palais de Tokyo – Installation Black Block – Paris, France
8 octobre 2003 – 13 octobre 2003 – Galerie du jour agnès b. – FIAC – Paris, France
18 septembre 2003 – 24 octobre 2003 – Galerie du jour agnès b. – A New New York Scene – Exposition collective – Paris, France
21 juin 2003 – 31 juillet 2003 – Dr Ernest Emilion & Pauline Lang D.C present Medecine For The Soul… small paintings by JonOne – Exposition personnelle –Paris, France
19 juin 2003 – Agnès b. – 100% Vandal A Lyon… Pour agnès b. JonOne Window Painting – Exposition personnelle – Lyon, France
6 juin 2003 – 26 juillet 2003 – Speerstra Gallery – JonOne Talking to Walls – Exposition personnelle – Paris, France
15 avril 2003 – Collaboration JonOne-agnès b., Galerie du jour agnès b. – Los Angeles, San Francisco & Chicago, Etats-Unis
 

2002
9 novembre 2002 – 30 novembre 2002 – Galerie du jour agnès b. – agnès b. graffiti JonOne – Ginza, Japon
24 octobre 2002 – 28 octobre 2002 – Galerie du jour agnès b. – FIAC – Paris, France
6 septembre 2002 – Galerie du jour agnès b. – Installation Works – Hong Kong, Chine
1er juin 2002 – 23 juin 2002 – Gallery Speak For – This is Me – Exposition collective (Jean-Charles de Castelbajac, JonOne, Andy Howell, Mambo, Ed Templeton, Marke Newton, Luke Newton, Pete Fowler, Akira Somekawa…) – Tokyo, Japon
17 mai 2002 – 29 juin 2002 – Speerstra Gallery – Black Diamonds – Exposition personnelle – Paris, France
22 février 2002 – 25 février 2002 – Galerie du jour agnès b. – The Armory Show – Exposition collective – New York, Etats-Unis
 

2001
2001 – Espace Zali – Color Wars – Paris, France
2001 – Triiad – Seven Deadly Sins (expo de toiles et vente de tee-shirts) – Paris, France
28 septembre 2001 – 27 octobre 2001 – Galerie du jour agnès b. – Exposition collective (André, A-One, BadBC, Futura, JonOne, L’Atlas, Mist, Moze, os Gemeos, O’Clock, Psyckoze, Space Invader, Zevs…) – Paris, France
14 juin 2001 – 5 juillet 2001 – Pop-Up Store – Digital Graffiti – Exposition personnelle – Paris, France
2001 – 6 juin 2001 – Galerie Michel Gillet – Color Wars – Paris, France
27 février 2001 – 4 mars 2001 – Aux Docks de Chavaux, Maison de l’Arbre – Exposition collective (Sophie Sainte-Marie, Eric Cazettes, Fabrice Ménier, Clément Bagot, Christian Mornet, JonOne, Psyckoze, Popof, Popay, Gilbert Petit) – Montreuil, France
 

2000
24 juin 2000 – Galerie Cargo – MurMure – Exposition collective – Paris, France
 

1999
1999 – Fondation Peter Pichler – Autriche
 

1998
1998 – Nowhere Land Gallery – Freestyle – Bruxelles, Belgique
12 mars 1998 – Junk by Junko Shimada – Junk loves JonOne – Exposition personnelle – Paris, France
 

1997
1997 – JonOne & Sharp, Preo, TMkyM – Tokyo, Japon
1997 – Junko Shimada – Exposition personnelle – Paris, France
 

1996
27 juillet 1996 – 28 juillet 1996 – Espace Grammont / Festival Interactif Attitude – Exposition collective (Delta & Shoe, Popay, P2b, JonOne 156, Creez 156, Nok, Sharp, Am7, Graid…) – Montpellier, France
3 mai 1996 – 31 mai 1996 – Galerie Michel Gillet – Crossing Paths – Exposition collective (JonOne & Dzine) – Paris, France
17 mars 1996 – 12 mai 1996 – La Laiterie – Paroles Urbaines – Exposition collective (Hondo, JonOne, Mahon, Mambo, Number 6, Popay, Rcf One, Rico, Sharp, Shuck, Sib, Spirit, Stak., A Plus, Echo, Gee One, Jay One, Mice, Mister E, Mode 2, Peso, Scotty, Time, Zhyne) – Strasbourg, France
 

1995
1995 – Mystery Tour 95 – Getting Up to the Voodoo Lounge – Exposition collective (A-One, Echo, JayOne, JonOne, Mode 2, Sharp) – Paris, France
9 novembre 1995 – 9 décembre 1995 – Galerie du jour agnès b. – Stripped, l’exposition – Exposition collective (JonOne, Futura 2000, Mode 2, Sharp, Jay One) – Paris, France
9 novembre 1995 – 3 décembre 1995 – Carrousel du Louvre – Exposition personnelle – Paris, France
8 septembre 1995 – 28 octobre 1995 – Idaho Gallery – Crossing Paths – Exposition collective (JonOne & Dzine) – Chicago, Etats-Unis
 

1994
1994 – L’Espace Dunoyer – Good Times – Paris, France
7 septembre 1994 – 30 septembre 1994 – Nowhere Land – … On The Wild Side – Exposition collective (JIHEF, GEOR, Martine Mayence, Luc de Bruyne – Invités : JonOne & Sharp) – Bruxelles, Belgique
22 juin 1994 – 25 juin 1994 – Spazio Jet Set – Gifted Force, Renegades the art world – Exposition collective (Sharp, JonOne) – Milan, Italie
28 avril 1994 – 28 mai 1994 – L’Espace Dunoyer – Color Vision – Exposition personnelle – Paris, France
 

1993
1993 – Gledisch 45 Gallery – Eight Urban Artists From New York – Exposition collective – Berlin, Allemagne
10 décembre 1993 – 29 janvier 1994 – Le Monde de l’Art – Moving painting 10 ans de bombe – Exposition collective (A-One, Ash, JonOne, Sharp) – Paris, France
3 juillet 1993 – 30 juillet 1993 – Esmod – Dark And Wild – Exposition collective (André, Axöne, Damoison, JonOne, O.Phojot, Popay, Roubert, Sharp, Tony 94) – Paris, France
6 juin 1993 – Les Bains – Hommage à Johnny Thunders – Exposition collective (Axöne, Ash, Di Rosa, Drano, El Rotringo, Kam, Jayone, JonOne, Matt, Marco, Megaton, Mino, Miss Tic, Monzon, Scott-Flament, Skki) – Paris, France
2 juin 1993 – A3 Foire Saint-Germain – Une nuit d’Art… ventures, 93 artistes – Exposition collective – Paris, France
5 mai 1993 – 5 juin 1993 – Espace Brother – Le Temps, L’Espace, L’Exploit – Exposition collective (Thibault Boyer, Grégory Ryan, Julio Villani, JonOne, Trois Carrés, Jean-Luc Blanc, Philippe Segond, Michaël, Delphine Bedel, Liz Stirling) – Paris, France
 

1992
1992 – Urban Art –
1992 – Palais de Chaillot – Graffiti Art – Exposition collective – Paris, France
1992 – Mairie de Clichy – Graffic Artism – Exposition collective – Clichy, France
1992 – Musée Picasso / agnès b. – Exposition collective – Antibes, France
1992 – Galerie Structures – Exposition personnelle – Montpellier, France
1992 – Gallery Magda Danysz – Paris, France
1992 – Galerie Michel Gillet / Speerstra Gallery – Exposition personnelle – Paris, France
1992 – Espace des Arts – Organisé par agnès b. – « Janviers en Bourgogne : Un regard sur l’art contemporain » – Exposition collective – Châlon-sur-Saône, France
3 décembre 1992 – 5 janvier 1993 – Galerie Michel Gillet / Galerie B5 (Speerstra Gallery – Tribal Instincts – Exposition personnelle – Paris, France
18 novembre 1992 – 31 décembre 1992 – Galerie B5 (Speerstra Gallery) – JonOne peintures – Exposition personnelle – Fontvieille, Monaco
24 juin 1992 – 19 juillet 1992 – Maison du peuple – Exposition collective (A.One, Asphalt, Ax.One, Banga, CK, D.Zine, Eros, Jon.1, Mambo, Mëo, Sharp, Shuck, Sib, Spirit, Voïs, Worm.1) – Clichy-La Garenne, France
16 juin 1992 – 30 juin 1992 – Passage de Retz – Dark And Wild / Spray Can Actors – Exposition collective (A-One, JonOne, Axöne, W.R.D, Sharp, O-Megaton) – Paris, France
2 juin 1992 – 3 juillet 1992 – CFDT-Espace Belleville – Figuration fin de Millénaire – En partenariat avec des galeries (Fabien Boulakia, Christophe, Xavier Delannoy, Michel Gillet, Jousse-Seguin, Yvon Lambert, Lavignes-Bastille, Loft, Alain Oudin, Polaris) – Exposition collective (Basuiat, Blek, Combas, Di Rosa, Haring, JonOne, Sharp, Miss Tic, Speedy Graphito…) – Paris, France
18 mai 1992 – 14 juin 1992 – L’Hôpital Ephémère – Exposition collective (JonOne, Jérôme Touron) – Paris, France
18 mai 1992 – 28 juin 1992 – L’Hôpital Ephémère – “JonOne” – Exposition personnelle – Paris, France
 

1991
1991 – Musée National des Monuments Français – Graffiti Art, Artistes américains et français 1981-1991 – Exposition collective – Paris, France
1991 – Casino de Vichy – Vichy, France
5 décembre 1991 – 5 janvier 1992 – Espace Chapon – Paris Graffiti / Exposition de 24 peintres – Exposition collective – Paris, France
3 décembre 1991 – Editions GDL – Exposition collective (JonOne, Crash, Daze, Axöne, Meo, Banga) – Paris, France
17 septembre 1991 – 11 octobre 1991 – Galerie Lebendiges Museum – A Step Beyond – Exposition collective (Ash, Jay One, JonOne, Skki) – Berlin, Allemagne
5 juillet 1991 – 15 septembre 1991 – L’Hôpital Ephémére – Les Ateliers – Exposition collective (Aurèle, Yan Le Crouhennec, David Franck, Caroline Gambier, JonOne, Nikolaï Ovtchinnikov, Frantz Raux, Grégory Ryan, Eva Siegwald, Jérôme Touron, Trois Carrés, Julio Villani) – Paris, France
19 juin 1991 – Espace Protis – JonOne – Exposition personnelle – Paris, France
29 mars 1991 – 29 avril 1991 – Centre Culturel de Nantes / Espace Graslin – The Bomb Art Exhibition – Exposition collective – Nantes, France
29 janvier 1991 – 14 mars 1991 – Liverpool Gallery – American Graffiti : A Survey – Exposition collective (Keith Haring, Jean-Michel Basquiat, Rammellzee, Futura 2000, A-One, Lee Quinones, Crash, Toxic, Phase II, Lady Pink, Koor, Noc 167, JonOne, Daze) – Bruxelles, Belgique
11 janvier 1991 – 9 février 1991 – Galerie Gleditsch 45 – Inside Graphitism – Exposition collective (The Bad Boys Crew : Ash Two, Jay One, Skki, JonOne) – Berlin, Allemagne
 

1990
1990 – M. Jean-Louis Goigoux (contact à Paris) – Paris, France
1990 – Galerie Bellevue – Exposition collective (JonOne, Skki) – Allemagne
1990 – Galerie Bélier – Cent Dessins – Exposition collective – Paris, France
19 octobre 1990 – 16 novembre 1990 – Galerie Gleditsch 45 – Graffitism – Exposition personnelle – Berlin, Allemagne
1er octobre 1990 – 16 octobre 1990 – Atelier Clavel – Peintures, Post-graffiti, Taggs – Exposition collective (Jon, Merot, Meo, Axone, Banga) – Paris, France
3 août 1990 – Spraycan Art – The Bad Boys Crew – Exposition collective (Ash Two, Jay One, Skki, JonOne) – Allemagne
 

1989
1989 – Galerie du jour agnès b. – Exposition collective – Paris, France
 

1988
1988 – Street Art – Exposition collective – Brindington, Angleterre
1988 – Prego – Exposition collective – Milan, Italie
 

1987
1987 – Fashion Moda BRONX N.Y – La Libertad Logico – Exposition collective – Brooklyn, Etats-Unis
 

1986
1986 – Front Line et Fun Gallery – Exposition collective – New York, Etats-Unis
1986 – Gallery N.Y – Exposition collective – New York, Etats-Unis
1986 – Frank Bernaducci – Exposition collective –
1986 – From Lane Gallery – Exposition collective – New York, Etats-Unis
 

1985
1985 – Roxy 
1985 – Frank Bernaducci Gallery – Exposition collective – New York, Etats-Unis 
1985 – Librizzi Gallery – Exposition collective – New York, Etats-Unis

Bibliography
 JonOne, Da Sun Will Always Shine, Galerie Le Feuvre, 2011, 51 p.
 JonOne, My Father's Keeper, Galerie Le Feuvre, 2010, 52 p.
 Never Lucas et JonOne, Maï / Jonone, Drago Arts & Communication, et al. "36 Chambers", 2009, 96 p.
 JonOne, JonOne Rock, Drago Arts & Communication, 2009, 40 p.
 JonOne, Carved In Stone, Galerie Brugier-Rigail, 2010, 96 p.
 JonOne, Black Diamonds, Speerstra Gallery, 2002, 28 p.
 JonOne, Night and Day, Speerstra Gallery, 2004, 24 p.
 JonOne, Follow the Sun, Speerstra Gallery, 2008, 24 p.
JonOne, The Chronicles, David Pluskwa gallery, 2015, 352p
JonOne, Birth of the Wind, Galerie Brugier-Rigail, 2018
JonOne, Poetry in Motion, Galerie Brugier-Rigail, 2019
JonOne, Monographie, Skira édition, 2019, 204p 
JonOne, Journal Intime (livre en édition limité - 500) 2020
JonOne, Obsession, (livre en édition limitée - 300), 2020

References

External links

 

1963 births
Living people
American emigrants to France
American graffiti artists